The Holy Rosary Church, also known as the Queen of the Holy Rosary Church, is a religious building affiliated with the Catholic church in the small town of Hell's Gate on the island of Saba, a dependent territory of the Kingdom of the Netherlands in the Lesser Antilles, Caribbean Sea.

Its history dates back to 1911 when the first wooden chapel was established for the Catholic community. Then in 1962, the current building was constructed in the same place and was dedicated by Bishop Holterman.

The temple follows the Roman or Latin rite and depends on the mission of the Conversion of St. Paul in the Catholic Diocese of Willemstad based on the island of Curaçao.

References

Roman Catholic churches in Saba
Roman Catholic churches completed in 1962
20th-century Roman Catholic church buildings in the Netherlands